Johann Philipp von Walderdorff (24 May 1701 – 12 January 1768) was the Archbishop-Elector of Trier from 1756 until 1768, and the Prince-Bishop of Worms from 1763 until 1768.

Biography
John Philip was born in Molsberg into the noble Walderdorff family. His parents were Baron Carl Lothar von Walderdorff zu Molsberg und Isenberg († 1722) and Baroness Anna Katharina Elisabeth von Kesselstatt († 1733). He became the general vicar of the upper diocese, and in 1742 was made a governor. With French support, in 1754 he was promoted to be the coadjutor and designated successor of Archbishop-Elector Francis George of Schönborn-Buchheim. In 1756 after Francis died John Philip succeeded him, and in 1763 he was also elected the Prince-Bishop of Worms.

John Philip (re)constructed (parts of) the Electoral Palace in Trier, Engers in Coblenz, Schloss Philippsfreude in Wittlich and his family's castle of Molsberg in Westerwald. He was Abraham Roentgen's best client, purchasing more than two dozen Roentgen pieces. He died in 1768.

References

1701 births
1768 deaths
People from Westerwaldkreis
John 09
Roman Catholic bishops of Worms
Latin archbishops of Patras
Walderdorff family